Matanog, officially the Municipality of Matanog,  is a 4th class municipality in the province of Maguindanao del Norte, Philippines. According to the 2020 census, it has a population of 36,034 people.

Matanog was created by virtue of Presidential Decree No. 780 signed by then President Ferdinand Marcos on August 25, 1975. It was carved from the municipality of Parang.

The town was part of the province of Shariff Kabunsuan from October 2006 until its nullification by the Supreme Court in July 2008.

Geography

Barangays

Matanog is politically subdivided into 8 barangays.
 Bayanga Norte
 Bayanga Sur
 Bugasan Norte
 Bugasan Sur (Poblacion)
 Kidama
 Sapad
 Langco
 Langkong

Climate

Demographics

Economy

References

External links
 [ Philippine Standard Geographic Code]
 Matanog Profile at the DTI Cities and Municipalities Competitive Index
Philippine Census Information
Local Governance Performance Management System

Municipalities of Maguindanao del Norte
Establishments by Philippine presidential decree